Moravian Falls is a waterfall in Wilkes County, North Carolina.

Geology
The waterfall is located on Moravian Creek, where it flows over a large bedrock to a lower plunge pool.

Natural history
The falls is privately owned by a campground who has built a reproduction of an old mill next to the falls.

Visiting the falls
From US Highway 421, exit onto NC Highway 18 and NC Highway 16.  Follow NC 18/16 south to the town of Moravian Falls, bearing right to stay on NC 18.  After 0.4 miles, turn left onto Falls Rd. and go 0.5 miles to a view of the falls on the left.

The falls is located on the grounds of the Moravian Falls Campground, whose owners have allowed the public to access the falls (so long as they ask permission at the inside the camp store before walking to the falls, which are viewable from the road (please do not slow down or block traffic to view them).

Visitors are required to obey all rules at the campground concerning the Falls, and are not allowed to swim near or above the falls.

Nearby falls
Boone Falls
Crystal Falls
Wingler Creek Falls
Gilbreath Falls
Carter Falls
North Deep Creek Falls

References

External links
 NC.Waterfalls.com

Waterfalls of North Carolina
Landforms of Wilkes County, North Carolina
Tourist attractions in Wilkes County, North Carolina